Martin Lynch (born 17 June 1970) is an Irish former Gaelic football player and selector who played for club side Clane. He scored 13-96 and made a combined 118 league and championship appearances with the Kildare senior football team.

Career

Lynch first played Gaelic football at a competitive level under the stewardship of his father at the local national school in Clane. He later won an All-Ireland Colleges Championship with Scoil Mhuire. By this stage Lynch had made his inter-county debut as a member of the Kildare minor football team that won the Leinster Minor Championship in 1987. He had just turned 18 when he made his senior debut in a National League game against Roscommon in October 1988. Lynch's was an All-Star recipient in 1991. He was part of the Clane club team that won four County Championship's between 1991 and 1997. The latter part of his inter-county career saw Lynch line out in Kildare's defeat by Galway in the 1998 All-Ireland final. He claimed two Leinster Championships before retiring from inter-county activity in 2002.

Honours

Clane
Kildare Senior Football Championship: 1991, 1992, 1995, 1997

Kildare
Leinster Senior Football Championship: 1998, 2000
Leinster Minor Football Championship: 1987

Awards
All-Star: 1991

References

External link

 Martin Lynch profile at the Hogan Stand website

1970 births
Living people
Clane Gaelic footballers
Kildare inter-county Gaelic footballers
Gaelic football selectors